The 2016 Tour of Belgium was the 86th edition of the Tour of Belgium cycling stage race. It took place from 25 to 29 May 2016 in Belgium as part of the 2016 UCI Europe Tour and was won by Dries Devenyns. Defending champion Greg Van Avermaet did not take part in the race.

On 28 May 2016, during the Stage 3, a crash of two motorcycles into the peloton injured 19 riders. The stage was cancelled that day and several riders abandoned the race and did not start on Stage 4. Stig Broeckx was reported to suffer severe injuries and was in a coma and vegetative (succumbing) state in the hospital in Gent.

Teams

Schedule

Stages

Prologue
25 May 2016 – Beveren to Beveren,

Stage 1
26 May 2016 – Buggenhout to Knokke-Heist,

Stage 2
27 May 2016 – Knokke-Heist to Herzele,

Stage 3
28 May 2016 – Verviers to Verviers, 

Two motorbikes crashed and fell into the peloton at high speeds about 65 km into the stage. 19 riders were involved into the crash, with Stig Broeckx, Fredrik Ludvigsson, Jesper Asselman, Andrea Guardini, Kristoffer Skjerping and Pieter Jacobs all transported to the hospital because of injuries. Broeckx, who had just recovered from injury after already being hit by a motorbike during the 2016 Kuurne–Brussels–Kuurne race two months earlier, was in worst shape as he immediately went unconscious and was later diagnosed to have two intracranial hemorrhages and a broken eye socket. Race direction and riders decided not to continue the race. A closed peloton rode to the finish in Verviers as the stage was cancelled.

Stage 4
29 May 2016 – Tremelo to Tongeren, 

Several riders did not start the race, most notably the entire team of Stig Broeckx, .

Classification leadership table

Standings

General classification

Points classification

Combativity classification

Team classification

References

External links

Tour of Belgium
Tour of Belgium
Tour of Belgium